Chouette is a French word meaning "owl" which has other uses.

 Species of owl
 Chouette D'Ussher, the Rufous fishing owl (Scotopelia ussheri)

 Uses relating to owls
 La chouette, a character portraying an owl in the opera L'enfant et les sortilèges by French composer Maurice Ravel
 "La chouette", a song by French composer Jeanne Herscher-Clément
 La chouette, a series of short CGI-animated episodes for children's television; see The Owl (TV series)
 La chouette aveugle, the original French name of The Blind Owl (film) of 1987
 La chouette d'or, a French treasure hunt created by Régis Hauser in 1993; see the Golden Owl quest
 "La chouette hulotte" (the tawny owl), a piece for solo piano in Catalogue d'oiseaux (195658) by French composer Olivier Messiaen
 Le cri de la chouette, an autobiographical novel of 1972 by Hervé Bazin
 Girouette la chouette, a children's book of 2007 by Nicole Tourneur
 Quand la chouette s'envole, a 1979 publication of Alexandre Astruc

 Other uses
 Backgammon chouette, a variant of the game of backgammon for three or more players
 Chouette Records, a US recording company
 Éditions Chouette / Chouette Publishing, based in Montreal, Canada, known for children's books featuring Caillou
 GPSO 92 Issy, nicknamed Les Chouettes

See also